Claire Mitchell is a Queens Counsel working in Scotland. She has a particular interest in constitutional, human rights and sentencing questions.

Career
She has an honours degree in law from University of Glasgow and became a QC in 2019 and was called at the Bar in 2003. Before that she was a solicitor in private practice since 1996.

Mitchell was President of the Scottish Criminal Bar Association from 2016 to 2018.

Views
Mitchell hopes that laws used to dispense historic pardons can be used in these cases, as they have been done for the  people in Salem, Massachusetts.

She supports the use of new technology to ensure business continuity for law courts in the wake of the COVID 19 pandemic  She said “Covid has forced us all well past where we thought we would be in 2021. We are now seeing the benefits of investing in technology. Measures which increase efficiency save money which can then be reinvested in measures which increase efficiency – it’s a virtuous circle.”

She leads the 'Witches of Scotland' campaign with Zoe Venditozzi to seek posthumous justice for women historically convicted and executed as witches in Scotland. The campaign used Twitter as its main channel to reach the public and a petition to the Scottish parliament as a way to influence policy makers.

Other roles
She is on the panel of the Bloody Scotland book club 

She is one of the legal experts involved in the  2021 TV series Murder Island, based on a drama written by Ian Rankin.

Recognition
She received a "Special Recognition Award" in 2013 from Law Awards of Scotland.

References 

Living people
Scottish barristers
Scottish women lawyers
Year of birth missing (living people)
Alumni of the University of Glasgow